Ethmia cordia is a moth in the family Depressariidae. It is found in eastern Mexico.

The ground color of the forewings is divided by a sinuate (wavy), longitudinal line and is dark brown above and white below to the dorsum. The ground color of the hindwings is whitish basally, becoming pale brownish distally.

References

Moths described in 1973
cordia